Power of 10 is a 2009 Philippine television game show broadcast by GMA Network. Hosted by Janno Gibbs, it premiered on May 10, 2009 on the network's Sunday primetime line up. The show concluded on December 27, 2009 with a total of 34 episodes.

Host
 Janno Gibbs

Ratings
According to AGB Nielsen Philippines' Mega Manila household television ratings, the pilot episode of Power of 10 earned a 24% rating.

References

2009 Philippine television series debuts
2009 Philippine television series endings
Filipino-language television shows
GMA Network original programming
Philippine game shows
Philippine television series based on American television series